Varol Ürkmez (1937 – 29 January 2021) was a Turkish footballer. He played in four matches for the Turkey national football team from 1958 to 1965.

References

External links
 

1937 births
2021 deaths
Turkish footballers
Turkey international footballers
Association footballers not categorized by position
Sportspeople from Adapazarı